Servicio de Inteligencia del Ejército (Army Intelligence Service, SIE) is the Argentine Army's intelligence agency. It is a division of J-2 and reports to the Army's Jefatura II (the General Staff's intelligence service). 

The Service is composite of 11 Intelligence Companies, 30 Independent Intelligence  Platoons, 1 Intelligence Support Group, 1 Military Intelligence Collector Centre, 3 Division Intelligence Collection Centre, and 2 Combat Army Intelligence Detachment (601 & 602), two units of special intelligence operations.

Intelligence Units

See also
Argentine Army
Naval Intelligence Service
Air Force Intelligence Service
National Intelligence System
National Directorate of Strategic Military Intelligence

External links
 Official website (archived)

Argentine intelligence agencies
Argentine Army